Opharus fallax is a moth of the family Erebidae. It was described by Hervé de Toulgoët in 2002. It is found in Bolivia.

References

Opharus
Moths described in 2002
Moths of South America